Hypocala andremona, the andremona moth, is a species of moth in the family Erebidae. It is found in North America. The Hypocala andremona is a species of moth that is classified as Lepidoptera: Noctuidae or also commonly known as Owlet moths. Hypocala andremona moths reproduce by laying eggs caused by sexual reproduction between a male and a female. 

The MONA or Hodges number for Hypocala andremona is 8642.

References

Hohmann, Meneguim, A. M., & Lovato, L. (2011). "Bioecological aspects of Hypocala andremona on persimmon cultivars/Aspectos bioecologicos de Hypocala andremona em cultivares de caquizeiro." Acta scientiarum. Agronomy, 33(1), 33–35. https://doi.org/10.4025/actasciagron.v33i1.5860

Further reading

 
 
 

Hypocalinae
Articles created by Qbugbot
Moths described in 1781